John Joseph Perko  (February 20, 1914 – May 8, 1973) was a professional football player for eight seasons in the National Football League. He played for Pittsburgh Pirates-Steelers his entire career. In 1944, he also played on the Steelers-Chicago Cardinals merged team, "Card-Pitt". Prior to playing professional football, Perko played at the college level while attending Duquesne University.

Family
In December 1935, Perko eloped with his girlfriend, Gloria Sutter in West Virginia.

References
Another Duke Gridder Tackled by Dan Cupid Pittsburgh Post-Gazette'' December 7, 1935

1914 births
1994 deaths
People from Chisholm, Minnesota
Players of American football from Minnesota
American football offensive linemen
Card-Pitt players
Pittsburgh Pirates (football) players
Pittsburgh Steelers players
Duquesne University alumni